Johnny Colt (born Charles Brandt; May 1, 1966) is an American bass guitar player who formerly played with the southern rock bands Lynyrd Skynyrd and The Black Crowes.

Music career
From 1989 he was the original bassist for The Black Crowes which formed in Atlanta, Georgia. Colt played on four full-length albums with the band and toured extensively.  
After leaving the Black Crowes in 1997 he went on to form the Brand New Immortals with guitarist David Ryan Harris and drummer Kenny Cresswell. Colt played bass for the American modern rock band Train from 2003–2006. In addition he joined Tommy Lee, becoming the permanent replacement for Jason Newsted (formerly of Metallica) in the band Rock Star Supernova. Colt has made numerous DJ performances with Tommy Lee, Rob Wonder and DJ MB3.

In 2012, he joined Lynyrd Skynyrd as their new bassist before departing from the band in 2017.

Business ventures
Colt is co-owner of the Atlanta-based backline company Avatar Events Group with Kenny Cresswell which opened in 1995. Avatar Events Group is a music equipment rental, production, storage, and rehearsal space company which also hosts numerous local and international based bands and musicians.

Along with Train tour manager Thomas O'Keefe, he opened NoDa Studios in Charlotte, North Carolina in the fall of 2007. NoDa Studios is a band rehearsal studio located in the NoDa (neighborhood) of Charlotte.

In media
With Cartoon Network and Adult Swim executive Michael Ouwleen (Harvey Birdman, Attorney at Law, Space Ghost), Colt also co-hosts the AM radio talk show 'Politely Disruptive' on WMLB AM1690 (the Voice of the Arts). The show airs on Tuesdays and Thursdays in the metro Atlanta area. 'Politely Disruptive' also is broadcast via internet stream at www.1690wmlb.com .

On September 7, 2009, Colt premiered as the host of the Travel Channel's reality show At Full Volume. In 2008 Colt was a part of Tommy Lee's team on the TV reality show Battle Ground Earth which also starred rapper Ludacris and aired on TLC.

References

External links
Official web site

Politely Disruptive radio program

1966 births
Living people
American radio DJs
American rock bass guitarists
American male bass guitarists
Lynyrd Skynyrd members
The Black Crowes members
People from Cherry Point, North Carolina
American male guitarists
Train (band) members
20th-century American guitarists